The 2014 Porsche Carrera Cup Italia season was the eighth Porsche Carrera Cup Italy season. It began on 10 May in Misano and finished on 26 October in Monza, after seven rounds with two races at each event. Matteo Cairoli won the drivers' championship driving for Antonelli Motorsport, which won the teams' championship.

Teams and drivers

Race calendar and results

Championship standings

Drivers' Championship

† — Drivers did not finish the race, but were classified as they completed over 75% of the race distance.

Teams' Championship

Michelin Cup
The Michelin Cup is the trophy reserved to the gentlemen drivers.

Porsche Carrera Cup Italia Scholarship Programme
The Scholarship Programme Cup is the trophy reserved to the under-26 drivers elected by Porsche at the beginning of the season.

External links
 

Porsche Carrera Cup Italy seasons
Porsche Carrera Cup Italy